Lâm Thuận (born 20 November 1998) is a Vietnamese footballer who plays as a winger for V.League 1 club  Hồ Chí Minh City

References 

1998 births
Living people
Vietnamese footballers
Association football midfielders
V.League 1 players
Than Quang Ninh FC players
People from Bình Phước Province